In Old Missouri (1940) is a film starring the hillbilly comedy troupe the Weaver Brothers and Elviry, and released by Republic Pictures.

Brothers Leon "Abner" Weaver and Frank "Cicero" Weaver, with Frank's wife June "Elviry" Weaver, were vaudeville comedians who starred in a series of Republic films. A young Alan Ladd plays a featured role.

Plot
A family of sharecroppers, the Weavers, takes up residence in the home of a rich man named Pittman after they are forced off their land. They sell off Mrs. Pittman's furs and meet Junior Pittman's troupe of dancing girls. After they befriend Mr. Pittman, they persuade him to play dead until he can learn exactly how the rest of his family feels about him.

Cast
 Leon Weaver as Abner
 Frank Weaver as Cicero
 June Weaver as Elviry
 Thurston Hall as Mr. Pittman
 Marjorie Gateson as Mrs. Pittman
 Alan Ladd as Junior Pittman
 June Storey as Mary

References

External links
In Old Missouri at IMDb

1940 films
1940 adventure films
American adventure films
American black-and-white films
Films directed by Frank McDonald
1940s English-language films
1940s American films